Bhawan Bahadur Nagar (B. B. Nagar) is a town and a Nagar panchayat in Bulandshahr district in the state of Uttar Pradesh, India. It is also a part of the National Capital Region of Delhi. This town is near to Hapur District.

Demographics
 census of India, Bhawan Bahadur Nagar had a population of 10,188. Males constitute 53% of the population and females 47%. Bhawan Bahadur Nagar has an average literacy rate of 60%, higher than the national average of 59.5%; with male literacy of 72% and female literacy of 46%. 15% of its population is under 6 years of age. BB Nagar stands for Bhawan Bahadur Nagar.

About B. B. Nagar 
Siyana is the tehsil of BB Nagar. BB Nagar is a Block of Bulandshahr district.

Bal Yuva Sangathan (bbnagar.youth) is an active youth organization of town. There are many popular person in BB nagar Block. As Pandit Deen Dhayal Sharma from Dhumara, and Late. Lala Bankey Lal, Shri Nihal Singh s/o Shri Rishal singh from village Dhakoli. He was a freedom fighter and most popular by his dedication against endeavoring for the progressive work in this area,  BB Nagar is most popular Educational Hub in area.

There is a park and two government colleges - Swatantra Bharat Inter college (SB inter college) for Boys and Government Girls Inter college for girls. There is one Degree College for both Boys & Girls. There are two hospitals and one veterinary hospital and Block also. The sweet of "Bajre ki baal", invented in BB Nagar, is very tasty and famous. The students from SB Inter college BB Nagar are serving the country at different positions. Some of them are: Shri Subodh Kumar Prajapti S/O Ram Kumar Prajapati (Ministry of Power) of village Keshopur Sathla,Shri Rupendra Gaur (Inspector, UPP) of village Sathla, Professor Rajpal Singh Sirohi (former director, IIT Delhi) of Village Sehra, Shri Rajendra (IES) of Village Benipur (chief Engineer in Railway), Raj Bahadur Tokas (Scientist, BARC),   

Dr. Mohit Tyagi (Scientist, Bhabha Atomic Research Centre), Upasna Chauhan D/O Bhopal Singh (M.tech iit delhi), Honey Tyagi (Physics Honor's Kirori Mal College, DU), Dr Dr. Puran Singh Sirohi (PS Sirohi) of village Dhakoli, Dr Vikas Sharma (professor in Amity university) Shri Vineet Gaur of BB Nagar (Engineer in Bhabha Atomic Research Centre), Yogesh Sharma (Scientist in Bhabha Atomic Research Centre), Nitin Sharma (BARC), Dr. Anurag Gaur (Associate Professor of Physics in NIT Kurukshetra), Dr. Amit Kumar (Scientist in BARC, Mumbai) of Pali Khera village, Shri Vipin Kumar Chaudhary (Jal Shakti Mantralaya) of Pali khera village, Dr. Neeraj Kumar (Radiation safety officer and medical physicist in Batra Hospital Delhi) of Pali Khera village.

References

Cities and towns in Bulandshahr district